The following highways are numbered 51:

Australia
 Kamilaroi Highway
 Plenty Road

Cambodia
National Road 51 (Cambodia)

Canada
 Alberta Highway 51 (defunct)
 Saskatchewan Highway 51

Finland
 Finnish national road 51

France
A51 autoroute

Hungary
 M51 expressway (Hungary)

India
 National Highway 51 (India)

Iran
 Zobahan Freeway
 Road 51

Italy
 Autostrada A51

Japan
 Japan National Route 51

Korea, South

New Zealand
 New Zealand State Highway 51

Philippines
 N51 highway (Philippines)

South Africa

  R51

Turkey
  , a motorway in Turkey running from Adana to Mersin.

United Kingdom
 British A51 (Kingsbury-Chester)

United States
 U.S. Route 51
 Alabama State Route 51
 Arizona State Route 51
 Arkansas Highway 51
 California State Route 51 (unsigned)
 Colorado State Highway 51 (1923-1968) (former)
 Florida State Road 51
 County Road 51 (Hamilton County, Florida)
 Georgia State Route 51
 Georgia State Route 51 (1920) (former)
 Hawaii Route 51
 Idaho State Highway 51
 Illinois Route 51 (former)
 Indiana State Road 51
 Iowa Highway 51
 K-51 (Kansas highway)
 Maryland Route 51
Maryland Route 51A
Maryland Route 51B (former)
Maryland Route 51C (former)
Maryland Route 51D
Maryland Route 51E
Maryland Route 51F
 M-51 (Michigan highway)
 Minnesota State Highway 51
 County Road 51 (Anoka County, Minnesota)
 County Road 51 (Ramsey County, Minnesota)
 Missouri Route 51
 Nebraska Highway 51
 Nebraska Link 51A
 Nebraska Link 51B
 Nebraska Link 51C
 Nebraska Recreation Road 51E
 Nebraska Recreation Road 51F
 Nebraska Recreation Road 51G
 Nebraska Recreation Road 51H
 Nevada State Route 51
 New Hampshire Route 51
 New Jersey Route 51 (former)
 County Route 51 (Bergen County, New Jersey)
 County Route S51 (Bergen County, New Jersey)
 County Route 51 (Monmouth County, New Jersey)
 New Mexico State Road 51
 New York State Route 51
 County Route 51 (Cayuga County, New York)
 County Route 51 (Dutchess County, New York)
 County Route 51 (Erie County, New York)
 County Route 51 (Essex County, New York)
 County Route 51 (Franklin County, New York)
 County Route 51 (Greene County, New York)
 County Route 51 (Herkimer County, New York)
 County Route 51 (Madison County, New York)
 County Route 51 (Oneida County, New York)
 County Route 51 (Orange County, New York)
 County Route 51 (Putnam County, New York)
 County Route 51 (Rensselaer County, New York)
 County Route 51 (Rockland County, New York)
 County Route 51 (Saratoga County, New York)
 County Route 51 (Schoharie County, New York)
 County Route 51 (Suffolk County, New York)
 County Route 51 (Sullivan County, New York)
 County Route 51 (Ulster County, New York)
 North Carolina Highway 51
 Ohio State Route 51
 Oklahoma State Highway 51
 Oklahoma State Highway 51A
 Oklahoma State Highway 51B
 Oregon Route 51
 Pennsylvania Route 51
 Rhode Island Route 51
 South Carolina Highway 51
 Tennessee State Route 51
 Texas State Highway 51
 Texas State Highway Spur 51
 Farm to Market Road 51
 Texas Park Road 51
 Utah State Route 51
 Virginia State Route 51
 Virginia State Route 51 (1928-1950) (former)
 West Virginia Route 51
 West Virginia Route 51 (1920s) (former)
 West Virginia Route 51 (1930s) (former)
 Wisconsin Highway 51 (former)
 Wyoming Highway 51

Vietnam 
 National Road 51 (Vietnam)

See also 
A51 (disambiguation)